Owensville is an unincorporated community in Albemarle County, Virginia.

St. James Church is listed on the National Register of Historic Places.

References

Unincorporated communities in Virginia
Unincorporated communities in Albemarle County, Virginia